Meiosimyza is a genus of small flies of the family Lauxaniidae.

Species

M. affinis (Zetterstedt, 1847)
M. bifaria (Shatalkin, 1993)
M. brachychaeta (Shatalkin, 1993)
M. compsella (Hendel, 1903)
M. conjugata (Becker, 1895)
M. decempunctata (Fallén, 1820)
M. decipiens (Loew, 1847)
M. emarginata (Becker, 1895)
M. homeotica Shatalkin, 2000
M. illota (Loew, 1847)
M. laeta (Zetterstedt, 1838)
M. mihalyii (Papp, 1978)
M. nigripalpis (Czerny, 1932)
M. obtusa (Collin, 1948)
M. omei (Malloch, 1929)
M. oreophila (Shatalkin, 1993)
M. pectinifera (Shatalkin, 1993)
M. pallidiventris (Fallén, 1820)
M. platycephala (Loew, 1847)
M. rorida (Fallén, 1820)
M. stylata (Papp, 1978)
M. subfasciata (Zetterstedt, 1838)
M. subpallidiventris (Papp, 1878)
M. vittata (Walker, 1849)

References

Lauxaniidae
Articles containing video clips
Schizophora genera
Taxa named by Friedrich Georg Hendel